Tetraphenylethene (TPE) is an organic chemical compound with the formula Ph2C=CPh2, where Ph = phenyl (C6H5).  It has been described as a yellow solid, but single crystals are colorless.  The molecule is crowded such that all four phenyl groups are twisted out of the plane defined by the center six carbon atoms.  Tetraphenylethene is used as a precursor to other organic compounds, often in the area of supramolecular chemistry.

Synthesis
Tetraphenylethene can be synthesized from diphenyldichloromethane.

References 

Aromatic hydrocarbons